Pedro Gonet Branco is a Brazilian law student who was one of the youngest scholars in the world to be cited by the Brazilian Supreme Federal Court, at the age of 20. 

He stood out nationally for publishing opinion articles in the newspaper O Estado de São Paulo about the relationship between Law and society. 

He is also known for having produced and hosted the television Talk-Show Falando em Justiça, at TV Justiça.

Activities

Opinion articles 
Pedro publishes monthly opinion articles at O Estado de São Paulo about law and its connection to different aspects of the life, such as its relationship with wine, music, the environment, health, the internet, business, politics, among others. He also writes for specialized law blogs.

Papers 
Since he started law school at the University of Brasília, at the age of 18, he has published scientific papers in national and international academic journals. 

At the age of 20, still as a law student, he co-authored a paper about the regulation of the internet, that was used by the Supreme Federal Court to sustain the unconstitutionality of a consumer defense law, making Pedro one of the youngest academics in the world to be cited by the Supreme Court in a decision.

TV Justiça 
 
Pedro hosted and produced the TV Talking-Show Falando em Justiça, at TV Justiça, throughout 2020.

The program had prestige for bringing debates with legal scholars, political actors and other relevant people. Among the interviewees, he had the Supreme Federal Court Justice Gilmar Mendes, the philosopher Luiz Felipe Pondé, and the former State Minister Daniel Vargas.

Editor-in-Chief at the University of Brasilia Law Review 
Pedro is the editor-in-chief of the University of Brasília Law Review (RED|UnB) since 2019. The Law Review stands out as one of the main academic journals managed by Law Students  in Brazil.

In 2019, as the editor-in-chief of RED|UnB, he organized an important international event to discuss the role of Constitutional Courts in modern democracies, with the presence of the Supreme Federal Court Justice Cármen Lúcia, the president of the Supreme Court of Justice of Uruguay Eduardo Turell Araquistain and the magistrate of the Constitutional Court of Colombia Diego González.

In 2020, he coordinated a series of webinars with authorities about the Covid-19 pandemic. He interviewed, among others,  the Vice President of the Brazilian Senate Antonio Anastasia, the Portuguese former Congressman Jorge Bacelar Gouveia, the former State Minister of Planning Esteves Colnago, the Secretary General of the Federal Senate Board Luiz Fernando Bandeira de Mello and the Deputy Attorney General Paulo Gonet Branco.

In 2021, he led the RED|UnB Podcast, making exclusive interviews with Data Protection authorities from different countries, such as the South African Pansy Tlakula, the German Ulrich Kelber, the Dutch Hielke Hijmans, and the Mexican Josefina Roman Vergara. He also interviewed the 300th Anniversary University Professor at Harvard University, who served as the Dean of Harvard Law School, Martha Minow.

As editor-in-chief, he published papers by the Justices Gilmar Mendes, Reynaldo Fonseca, Ives Gandra Filho, Regina Helena Costa, Maria Elizabeth Rocha, Rogerio Schietti Cruz, Bruno Dantas and Sérgio Banhos. He has also translated and published papers written by professors Mark Tushnet, Terry Maroney, and Richard Albert.

References 

University of Brasília alumni
Brazilian jurists
Year of birth missing (living people)
Living people